A barretina (plural: barretines, diminutive of barret "cap") is a traditional hat that was frequently worn by men in parts of the Christian cultures of the Mediterranean Sea such as Catalonia, the Valencian Community, the Balearic Islands, Provence, Corsica, Sicily, Malta, Sardinia, part of Naples, part of the Balkans and parts of Portugal. It was also worn by Muslim men in Majorca until the Christian conquest of the island in the Middle Ages.

History
In Catalonia and Ibiza, men wore barretinas until the 19th century, especially in rural areas. Even in the 1940s and the 1950s, children in rural areas still commonly wore it. 

It took the form of a bag, made of wool, usually red, or sometimes purple. 

Today, the barretina is no longer commonly worn in everyday life, but is still used in traditional dances, or as a symbol of Catalan identity. A watercolor image dated 1885 of a seller of newspapers (private collection) is perhaps one of the most iconic Catalan images, as it portrays a weathered man standing resolute, new independent newspapers falling from his portable wooden box, a look of tolerance and endurance in his face, while all the while wearing his barretina proudly.

Painter Salvador Dalí sometimes wore the barretina in the 20th century.

In popular culture
Moments before the 2010 FIFA World Cup Final between Spain and the Netherlands, pitch invader Jimmy Jump rushed onto the field and attempted to place a barretina on the World Cup trophy before being apprehended by several security guards.

See also
Tuque
Revolt of the Barretines
Phrygian cap
Beret

References

External links

  Description and history of the barretina
  Graphical history of the barretina
  Barretina.com, all you need to know about barretines and Catalan culture
  Colla de sa Bodega (traditional Ibiza clothing and dancing) .

Catalan folklore
Catalan symbols
Hats
Catalan words and phrases

Spanish clothing
Italian clothing
Portuguese clothing